The sailfin armourhead (Histiopterus typus), also known as the threebar boarfish,  is a species of marine ray-finned fish, an armourhead from the family Pentacerotidae which is native to the Indian Ocean and the western Pacific Ocean. It is a commercially important species, and is the only known member of its genus.

References

Pentacerotidae
Fish described in 1844
Taxobox binomials not recognized by IUCN